Hadriana may refer to:
Bithynium, a town of ancient Bithynia
Mopsuestia, a town of ancient Cilicia